In enzymology, a (R,R)-butanediol dehydrogenase is an enzyme that catalyzes the chemical reaction

(R,R)-butane-2,3-diol + NAD  (R)-acetoin + NADH + H

Thus, the two substrates of this enzyme are (R,R)-butane-2,3-diol and NAD, whereas its 3 products are (R)-acetoin, NADH, and H.

This enzyme belongs to the family of oxidoreductases, specifically those acting on the CH-OH group of donor with NAD or NADP as acceptor. The systematic name of this enzyme class is (R,R)-butane-2,3-diol:NAD oxidoreductase. Other names in common use include butyleneglycol dehydrogenase, D-butanediol dehydrogenase, D-(−)-butanediol dehydrogenase, butylene glycol dehydrogenase, diacetyl (acetoin) reductase, D-aminopropanol dehydrogenase, D-aminopropanol dehydrogenase, 1-amino-2-propanol dehydrogenase, 2,3-butanediol dehydrogenase, D-1-amino-2-propanol dehydrogenase, (R)-diacetyl reductase, (R)-2,3-butanediol dehydrogenase, D-1-amino-2-propanol:NAD oxidoreductase, 1-amino-2-propanol oxidoreductase, and aminopropanol oxidoreductase. This enzyme participates in butanoic acid metabolism.

References 

 
 

EC 1.1.1
NADH-dependent enzymes